Zuibaichi Park is a station on Line 9 of the Shanghai Metro, close to Songjiang railway station. It began operation on December30, 2012. It is named after the nearby garden of Zuibaichi.

Around the station
 Songjiang Mosque
 Zuibaichi

Railway stations in Shanghai
Shanghai Metro stations in Songjiang District
Railway stations in China opened in 2012
Line 9, Shanghai Metro